Hibri is a surname. Notable people with the surname include:

 Azizah Y. al-Hibri, American academic
 Khalil al-Hibri, Lebanese politician and businessman
 Muhammad el-Hibri, Lebanese Scouting Federation
 Toufik El Hibri, one of the primary founders of the Scout movement in Lebanon